The Royal Bank of Canada class-action lawsuit is an $800 million pay-violation class-action lawsuit initiated by employees of the Royal Bank of Canada's Dominion Securities branch.

Lawsuit 
The class action lawsuit was certified on the Ontario Supreme Court on December 29, 2022, following the lodging of the claim on July 9, 2020. Employees of the Royal Bank of Canada (RBC) claim that the company owes them for unpaid statutory holidays and other vacation days.

The claim is about employees at the Dominion Securities branch of the bank. The lead plaintiff is former RBC staffer Leigh Cunningham of Winnipeg. Employees are claiming damages of $800 million. The law firms representing the claimants are Roy O’Connor LLP, Cavalluzzo LLP, and Whitten & Lublin PC.

See also 

 List of class-action lawsuits
 Freedom Convoy class action lawsuit

References

External links 
 Official website

Class action case law in Canada
Wages and salaries
Royal Bank of Canada